Lucjan Antoni Brychczy (otherwise known as Kici; born 13 June 1934) is a former Polish football player who is most notable for winning four top-tier titles with Legia Warsaw, but was also a keen archer.

In football, he represented ŁTS Łabędy Gliwice and Piast Gliwice. He transferred to Warsaw for the 1954 season due to military commitments, where he remained until the end of his playing career not just as a player, but also as a coach.

He won four titles with Warsaw, in 1955, 1956, 1969 and 1970 as well as four Polish Cups, in 1955, 1956, 1964 and 1966. He scored 182 goals in a career which lasted 19 seasons, both of which remain club records to this day. His Legia career also included a foray into the semi-finals of the European Cup. He was also part of Poland's squad at the 1960 Summer Olympics.

It is said that Real Madrid and AC Milan were interested in securing his services but during that time it was impossible to leave the country due to the restrictions of the communist regime.

Brychczy was awarded the Officer's Cross of the Order of Polonia Restituta.

References

1934 births
Living people
Polish footballers
Poland international footballers
Legia Warsaw players
Piast Gliwice players
Olympic footballers of Poland
Footballers at the 1960 Summer Olympics
Polish football managers
Legia Warsaw managers
Ekstraklasa players
Sportspeople from Ruda Śląska
Officers of the Order of Polonia Restituta
Association football forwards